The 2014 Chrono des Nations was a one-day time trial held at the end of the European cycling season in France on 19 October. The race has an UCI rating of 1.1. The race was won by Ukrainian Hanna Solovey.

Results

References

External links

 

Chrono des Nations
2014
Chrono des Nations